Strachiini is a tribe of shield bugs in the subfamily Pentatominae.

Genera
(following)
 Afrania
 Afraniella
 Bagrada
 Capnoda
 Compsoprepes
 Eurydema
 Grossiana
 Madates
 Murgantia
 Pylophora
 Stenozygum
 Strachia

References

Pentatominae
Hemiptera tribes